Ivan Kamenec (born 27 August 1938) is a Slovak historian.

Life
His father, a civil engineer managed to secure an economic exception to the 1942 deportations, during which most Slovak Jews were sent to the extermination camps. Kamenec avoided the resumption in anti-Jewish persecution during and after the Slovak National Uprising by hiding with his family in a bunker from September 1944 to April 1945, when Slovakia was liberated by the Red Army. He attended secondary school in Topoľčany. He graduated from Faculty of Philosophy of Comenius University in Bratislava in 1961. Then he worked at the State Slovak Central Archive in Bratislava and the Slovak National Museum in Bratislava. At present, he works at the Institute of History of Slovak Academy of Sciences. He is a chairman of Slovak section of common Czech-Slovak Commission of Historians and a member of the board of directors of Holocaust Documentation Center. The main theme of his scientific research is the political and cultural history of Slovakia in the 20th century. He deals especially with the history of the First Slovak Republic from the years 1939–1945, the political system and the political and cultural elites. He is a respected scholar in the area of the Holocaust in Slovakia and his work On the Trail of Tragedy belongs to basic works in this field. The work was written in the 1970s but was not published until 1991 because the topic was tabooed in Czechoslovakia during the communistic era.

Some of Kamenec's critics have used his Jewish heritage to dismiss his academic work. Because of the controversial nature of his work, he has received death threats. However, Kamenec told The Slovak Spectator that he did not take it seriously because such individuals are not representative of Slovak society.

Kamenec was awarded the Order of Ľudovít Štúr, 1st Class, by the president of Slovakia in January 2017 for his contributions to the academic discipline of history and the promotion of human rights and democracy.

Selected works

Monographs
 1984 Začiatky marxistického historického myslenia na Slovensku. (Historizmus a jeho úloha v slovenskom revolučnom robotníckom hnutí.) [The Beginnings of Marxist Historical Thought in Slovakia. (Historicism and its Role in Slovak Revolutionary Labor Movement)] (in Slovak).
 1991 Po stopách tragédie [On the Trail of Tragedy] (in Slovak)
 1992 Slovenský stát (1939–1945) [The Slovak State (1939-1945] (in Slovak)
 1993 Trauma: Az első Szlovák Köztársaság (1939–1945) [Trauma: The Slovak State (1939-1945)] (in Hungarian, translation)
 1998 Tragédia politika, kňaza a človeka. (Dr. Jozef Tiso 1887–1947.) [Tragedy of a Politician, a Priest and a Man (Dr. Jozef Tiso 1887–1947)] (in Slovak)
 2000 Hľadanie a blúdenie v dejinách. Úvahy, štúdie a polemiky. [Searching and Wandering in History. Considerations, Studies and Controversies] (in Slovak)
 2001 Tragedia polityka, księdza i człowieka. (Jozef Tiso 1887–1947.) [Tragedy of a Politician, a Priest and a Man (Dr. Jozef Tiso 1887–1947)] (in Polish, translation)
 2007 On the Trail of Tragedy. The Holocaust in Slovakia (in English, translation).
 2008 Slovenský štát v obrazoch (1939–1945) [The Slovak State in Pictures] (in Slovak)

Collective works and editions of documents
 1988 Na spoločnej ceste [On the Common Journey] (in Slovak)
 1985 Dejiny Slovenska. Vol. 5. (1918–1945) [History of Slovakia Vol. 5 (1918-1945)] (in Slovak)
 1988 Dejiny Slovenska. Vol. 6. (1945–1960) [History of Slovakia Vol. 6 (1945-1960)] (in Slovak)
 1992 Politické strany na Slovensku 1860–1989. [Political Parties in Slovakia 1860-1989] (in Slovak)
 1992 Vatikán a Slovenská republika (1939–1945). Dokumenty. [The Vatican and the Slovak Republic (1939–1945). Documents.] (in Slovak)
 1997 Jozef Tiso. Tanulmánya [Jozef Tiso. Study] (in Hungarian)
 2000 Historik v čase a priestore. Laudatio Ľubomírovi Liptákovi. [Historian in Time and Space. Laudatio for Ľubomír Lipták] (in Slovak).
 2003 Holokaust na Slovensku. Vol. 2. Prezident, vláda, Snem SR a Štátna rada o židovskej otázke (1939–1945). Dokumenty. [The Holocaust in Slovakia. Vol. 2.  President, Government, Diet and the State Council of the Slovak Republic about the Jewish Question (1939-1945). Documents]. (in Slovak)
 2004 Holokaust na Slovensku. Vol. 5. Židovské pracovné tábory a strediská na Slovensku 1938–1944. Dokumenty. [The Holocaust in Slovakia. Vol. 5. Jewish Labor Camps and Resorts in Slovakia 1938–1944. Documents] (in Slovak)

Awards
 1999 International literal price of E. E. Kisch.
 2008 Price of the Slovak Academy of Sciences for science popularization work.
 2012 Scientist of the year 2012 in category "Recognition for lifetime achievements in the Slovak Republic".
 2017 Order of Ľudovít Štúr, 1st Class

References

Sources

Further reading
  

1938 births
20th-century Slovak historians
Members of the Slovak Academy of Sciences
Comenius University alumni
People from Nitra
Living people
Historians of the Holocaust
Holocaust survivors
Historians of Slovakia
21st-century Slovak historians
Order of Ľudovít Štúr